Etrog has become an epithet in the Israeli politics for a politician whom journalists prefer not to criticize in order to pave his way to a certain political position, or in order to promote common interests. 

The first use of this metaphor is attributed to the Israeli journalist Amnon Abramovich. In February 2005, during Ariel Sharon's campaign to promote his disengagement plan, Abramovich (who supported the plan) said that Israeli journalists should treat Sharon like an "Etrog": as long as the disengagement plan was not completed they should cherish him and refrain from attacking him, but once the plan was carried out they should treat him like an etrog after the holiday [of Sukkot] is over, i.e. stop protecting him. This metaphor caught on quickly, and today it is not uncommon to use the term as a verb, e.g. "The press etrogs certain ministers" (לְאַתְרֵג).

References

Politics of Israel